Lieutenant-General Sir (Horace) Rollo (Squarey) Pain  (11 May 1921 – 14 April 2005) was a British Army officer who commanded 2nd Division.

Military career
Educated at Clifton College, Pain was commissioned into the Royal Armoured Corps in 1943 during World War II and served in North West Europe. He was awarded the MC for his leadership during fighting for control of the village of Stemmen in Germany.

After the War he saw active service in Palestine during the Palestine Emergency, for which he was mentioned in dispatches. In 1962 he became Commanding Officer of the 4th/7th Royal Dragoon Guards. He was appointed Commander of 5th Infantry Brigade in North Borneo in 1965, Assistant Chief of Staff, Operations at the Ministry of Defence in 1969 and General Officer Commanding (GOC) of the 2nd Division in 1970. He went on to be Director of Military Training in 1972 and Head of the British Defence Staff in Washington, D.C. in 1975 before retiring in 1978.

He was given the colonelcy of the 4th/7th Royal Dragoon Guards from 1979 to 1983.

Family
In 1950 he married Denys Chaine-Nickson; they had a son and two daughters.

References

|-

1921 births
2005 deaths
British military personnel of the Palestine Emergency
British Army lieutenant generals
Knights Commander of the Order of the Bath
Recipients of the Military Cross
4th/7th Royal Dragoon Guards officers
People educated at Clifton College
British Army personnel of the Indonesia–Malaysia confrontation
British Army personnel of World War II
British military attachés
Royal Armoured Corps officers